Plinian eruptions or Vesuvian eruptions are volcanic eruptions marked by their similarity to the eruption of Mount Vesuvius in 79 AD, which destroyed the ancient Roman cities of Herculaneum and Pompeii. The eruption was described in a letter written by Pliny the Younger, after the death of his uncle Pliny the Elder.

Plinian/Vesuvian eruptions are marked by columns of volcanic debris and hot gases ejected high into the stratosphere, the second layer of Earth's atmosphere. The key characteristics are ejection of large amount of pumice and very powerful continuous gas-driven eruptions. According to the Volcanic Explosivity Index, Plinian eruptions have a VEI of 4, 5 or 6, sub-Plinian 3 or 4, and ultra-Plinian 6, 7 or 8.

Short eruptions can end in less than a day, but longer events can continue for several days or months. The longer eruptions begin with production of clouds of volcanic ash, sometimes with pyroclastic surges. The amount of magma erupted can be so large that it depletes the magma chamber below, causing the top of the volcano to collapse, resulting in a caldera. Fine ash and pulverized pumice can deposit over large areas. Plinian eruptions are often accompanied by loud noises, such as those generated by the 1883 eruption of Krakatoa. The sudden discharge of electrical charges accumulated in the air around the ascending column of volcanic ashes also often causes lightning strikes as depicted by the English geologist George Julius Poulett Scrope in his painting of 1822 or observed during 2022 Hunga Tonga–Hunga Ha'apai eruption and tsunami.

The lava is usually dacitic or rhyolitic, rich in silica. Basaltic, low-silica lavas rarely produce Plinian eruptions unless specific conditions are met (low magma water content <2%, moderate temperature, and rapid crystallization); a recent basaltic example is the 1886 eruption of Mount Tarawera on New Zealand's North Island.

Pliny's description

Pliny described his uncle's involvement from the first observation of the eruption:

Pliny the Elder set out to rescue the victims from their perilous position on the shore of the Bay of Naples, and launched his galleys, crossing the bay to Stabiae (near the modern town of Castellammare di Stabia). Pliny the Younger provided an account of his death, and suggested that he collapsed and died through inhaling poisonous gases emitted from the volcano. His body was found interred under the ashes of the eruption with no apparent injuries on 26 August, after the plume had dispersed, confirming asphyxiation or poisoning.

Examples
 The Long Valley Caldera eruption in Eastern California, United States, which happened over 760,000 years ago.
 The 10,950 BC eruption of Lake Laach in Rhineland-Palatinate, Germany.
 The 4860 BC eruption forming Crater Lake in Oregon, United States.
 The 1645 BC eruption of Thera in the south Aegean Sea, Greece.
 The 400s BC eruption of the Bridge River Vent in British Columbia, Canada.
 The 79 AD eruption of Mount Vesuvius in Pompeii, Italy. It was the prototypical Plinian eruption.
 The 180 AD Lake Taupo eruption in New Zealand.
 The 946 eruption of Paektu Mountain in China / North Korea.
 The 1257 eruption of Mount Samalas in Lombok, Indonesia.
 The 1600 eruption of Huaynaputina in Peru.
 The 1667 and 1739 eruptions of Mount Tarumae in Hokkaido, Japan.
 The 1707 eruption of Mount Fuji in Japan.
 The 1815 eruption of Mount Tambora in the island of Sumbawa, Indonesia.
 The 1883 eruption of Krakatoa in Sunda Strait, Indonesia.
 The 1886 eruption of Mount Tarawera in New Zealand.
 The 1980 eruption of Mount St. Helens in Washington in the western United States.
 The 1982 eruption of El Chichón in Chiapanecan Volcanic Arc, Chiapas, Mexico.
 The 1991 eruption of Mount Pinatubo in Zambales, Central Luzon, Philippines.
 The June 2009 eruption of Sarychev Peak in Russia.
 The 2011–2012 Puyehue-Cordón Caulle eruption in Chile.
 The 2014 eruption of Tungurahua volcano in Cordillera Oriental of Ecuador.
 The 2020 eruption of Taal Volcano in the Philippines.
 The 2022 eruption of Hunga Tonga–Hunga Ha'apai in Tonga.

Ultra-Plinian 

According to the Volcanic Explosivity Index, a VEI of 6 to 8 is classified as "ultra-Plinian". Eruptions in the ultra-Plinian category include the Lava Creek eruption of the Yellowstone Caldera (c. 640,000 years ago, VEI 8), Lake Toba (c. 74,000 years ago, VEI 8), Tambora (1815, VEI 7), Krakatoa (1883, VEI 6), Akahoya eruption of Kikai Caldera, Japan (VEI 7) and the 1991 eruption of Mount Pinatubo in the Philippines (VEI 6).

See also

 Peléan eruption, related to the explosive eruptions of the Mount Pelée
 Types of volcanic eruptions
 List of largest volcanic eruptions

References

External links
 USGS Photo Glossary Entry for Plinian Eruptions
 Volcanic mesocyclones

 
Volcanic eruption types